A library technician or library assistant is a skilled library and information paraprofessional trained to perform the day-to-day functions of a library, and assists librarians in the acquisition, preparation, and organization of information. They also assist library patrons in finding information. The widespread use of computerized information storage and retrieval systems has resulted in library technicians assisting in the handling of technical services (such as cataloguing) that were once performed exclusively by librarians. Especially in small village libraries, a library technician may be the only person (or one of only a few) staffing the library. In larger libraries, they may help run certain departments and supervise library clerks, aides, and volunteers. Because libraries are increasingly using new technologies (such as automated databases, CD-ROM, the Internet, and virtual libraries), the role of the library technician is expanding and evolving accordingly.

Qualifications
Library technicians differ from librarians in terms of education and main duties. Library technicians typically require a diploma, or, ideally, an associate degree in library technology from a community college or other similar institution, whereas librarians require a master's degree in library science from an accredited university-based graduate school of library and information science. Typically a librarian will have had an undergraduate baccalaureate degree in either library science or a field in which they wish to specialize, like history, prior to graduate study. However, for varying reasons, not all librarians are trained yet at the graduate level as professional societies and legal statutes would prefer, and so, as indicated above, sometimes technicians or other individuals with enough training must fill the role.

Tasks
Library technicians will often carry out the practical tasks involved in daily library operation, whereas librarians generally perform the managerial, supervisory and administrative functions. For example, a librarian may be responsible for creating a library's collection development policies, which would include selection criteria for purchasing of items. A library technician would then purchase items based on these criteria.  Library technicians may also be graduates of a four-year college, or institute. They could also be holders of a certificate, associate degree, or bachelor's degree. Because the education of the library technician is practical, broad, and skills-based, they are job-ready upon graduation; the only training they may require is that which is specific to their particular place of employment. Duties can vary with the type and size of the library but can include: cataloguing and classification of materials, data input to assist in acquiring print and nonprint materials, assisting in the provision of reference services, and circulation procedures. In a larger library in government or academia, senior library technicians with specialized and more extensive training (at the baccalaureate degree level) are often responsible for other technicians, clerical staff, student workers, and volunteers in a certain section or department. In smaller libraries, where the foundations of organization and operation are already established, such paraprofessionals sometimes serve as the manager or even the sole staff member.

Other duties of library technicians
 Shelve material returned and in order in the correct areas.
 Shelf read to make sure items are in the correct area.
 Sort items and arrange for later use.
 Pull materials from stacks.
 Register new patrons and update patron information when needed.	
 Renew patron loans.
 Inspect equipment and materials for damage upon return.
 Route interlibrary loan materials as needed.
 Make sure item request are properly entered into the circulation system.
 Keep availability of reserve items.
 Prepare overdue notice reports for administration as directed.
 Deliver incoming mail.
 Answer and route all incoming phone calls.
 Maintain photocopy and computer equipment.
 Perform physical maintenance of premises.

Library associate/manager
A library technician who regularly supervises or serves as library manager and has  advanced training is more properly known as a library associate.

Using the latest information technologies, the goal of library technicians is to bring together people, information, and materials and meet the challenges of a constantly changing information environment. Library technicians work in environments as diverse as business corporations, professional firms, financial institutions, cultural organizations, public libraries, and schools.

See also 
Archivist
Curator
Technician

References 

Library occupations